Simon Morris (ca 1780 – 1857) was an Irish-born politician in Newfoundland. He represented Placentia and St. Mary's in the Newfoundland House of Assembly from 1842 to 1848.

He was born in Waterford and came to Newfoundland in 1828 to join his brother Patrick, who was operating a trading firm. Morris also worked as cashier (general manager) for the Newfoundland Savings Bank.

His son Edward served in the Newfoundland legislative council.

References 

Year of birth uncertain
1857 deaths
Members of the Newfoundland and Labrador House of Assembly
People from Waterford (city)
Irish emigrants to pre-Confederation Newfoundland
Newfoundland Colony people